Oye Kuch Kar Guzar is a 2016 Pakistani online comedy film by djuice Pakistan, directed and written by Harris Rasheed and produced by Syed Zaheer Uddin and Emad Ishaq Khan. It is the first Pakistani online film. The film was released on YouTube on 3 December 2016.

Cast
 Ali Safina as Shamsher Iqbaldin/Sherry
 Uzair Jaswal as Junaid Hafeez Sarhadi/Jango
 Ushna Shah as Zara Hayat Khan (Xara)
 Mahjabeen Habib as Shabnam Mushtaq Chaudary

Episodes
The films has 5 episodes. Every episode except the last has 2 options to select online for the next episode on YouTube.

Shooting
The film was shot in Kallar Kahar (Chakwal), Katas Fort, Haveli Sardar Jawala Singh Sandu Padhana (Lahore) and Lahore Railway Station.

Soundtrack
 Chal Chal Chaltay Jana
 Parindey
 Anger Management
 Too Young For Guns

References

External links
 Oye Kuch Kar Guzar - Full Film (YouTube)
 Oye Kuch Kar Guzar - Alternate Ends (YouTube)

2016 films
2016 comedy films
Pakistani comedy films
2010s Urdu-language films
Interactive films